The Pacific tuftedcheek  (Pseudocolaptes johnsoni) is a passerine bird in the ovenbird family, which breeds in the tropical New World in the Andes of Colombia and Ecuador.

References

Pacific tuftedcheek
Birds of the Colombian Andes
Birds of the Ecuadorian Andes
Pacific tuftedcheek